Harold L. Klawans (1937–1998) was an academic neurologist who launched a parallel career as a writer.

Life
Klawans was born in Chicago.  After graduating with an M.D. degree from the University of Illinois in 1962, Dr. Klawans became a neurologist and professor of neurology and pharmacology at Rush Medical College.  He published in the fields of extrapyramidal disorders, neuropharmacology, and medical history and served as editor of The Journal of Clinical Pharmacology and of the encyclopedic Handbook of Clinical Neurology while publishing several novels.

His study Chekhov's Lie, written just three years before his 1998 death, addresses the challenges of combining medical practice with writing.

Bibliography
Selected works by Klawans include:

Nonfiction
Toscanini's Fumble and Other Tales of Clinical Neurology (1988) 
Newton's Madness: Further Tales of Clinical Neurology (1990) 
Trials of an Expert Witness: Tales of Clinical Neurology and the Law (1991) 
Life, Death, and In Between : Tales of Clinical Neurology (1992) 
Chekhov's Lie (1997) 
Why Michael Couldn't Hit and Other Tales of the Neurology of Sports (1998) 
Defending the Cavewoman and Other Tales of Evolutionary Neurology (2000)

Fiction 
Sins of Commission (1982) 
The Third Temple (1983)
Informed Consent (1986)
The Jerusalem Code (1988)
And Mother Makes Thirteen (1999)

References 

1937 births
1998 deaths
Writers from Chicago
University of Illinois alumni
American neurologists
20th-century American physicians
20th-century American writers
20th-century American male writers